A sixth-generation fighter is a conceptualized class of jet fighter aircraft design more advanced than the fifth-generation jet fighters that are currently in service and development. Several countries have announced the development of a sixth-generation aircraft program, including the United States, Russia and China, while Japan, Italy, the United Kingdom, France, Germany, Spain, and Sweden have joined together in collaborative multinational programs in an effort to spread development costs. The first sixth-generation fighters are expected to enter service in the 2030s.

Characteristics
While still at an early stage of development, several distinct characteristics common to many sixth-generation fighter concepts have evolved.

The fifth-generation abilities for air-to-air capability, battlefield survivability in the anticipated anti-access/area denial environment and ground support/attack will need to be enhanced and adapted to the future threat environment. An initial focus on air superiority roles has moved away from close-in dogfighting, which is becoming less common, and instead broadened to embrace ground support, cyber warfare and even space warfare capabilities, with beyond-visual-range (BVR) air-to-air missile capability remaining important. The flexibility to undertake manned and unmanned missions is also sought, along with the ability to integrate with more numerous fleets of satellite drones and ground sensors in a high-traffic networked environment to deliver full "data-to-decision" (D2D) capability.

Typical design characteristics anticipated to deliver these roles include:
 Advanced digital capabilities including high-capacity networking, AI, data fusion, cyber warfare, D2D and battlefield command, control and communications (C3) capabilities.
 Optionally manned, with the same airframe capable of conducting piloted, remote controlled or onboard-AI controlled missions.
 Enhanced human-systems integration, with virtual cockpits presented via helmet-mounted displays which allow the pilot 360-degree vision with AI-enhanced battlefield awareness, and replacing conventional instrument panels.
 Advanced stealth airframes and avionics.
 Advanced variable-cycle engines able to cruise economically but still deliver high thrust when required.
 Increased-range stand-off and BVR weapons.
 Potential use of directed-energy weapons such as a laser CIWS.

The feasibility of some of these characteristics remains uncertain. Development time and cost are likely to prove major factors in laying out practical roadmaps. Specific requirements are anticipated by some observers to crystallize around 2025.

History

Japan, United Kingdom, Italy, and Sweden

In 2010, the Japanese government revealed a concept sixth-generation jet fighter, the i3 FIGHTER. i3 is short for informed, intelligent and instantaneous.

In July 2014, Jane's Information Group reported that a House of Commons Defence Select Committee had published a report about the UK's "post-2030 combat aviation force structure". The report highlighted a possibility of the UK committing to a next generation fighter program to potentially replace the Eurofighter Typhoon post-2030; the Eurofighter Typhoon has since had its intended service life extended to around 2040. On 22 March 2016, Japan conducted the first flight of the Mitsubishi X-2 Shinshin testbed aircraft for this project.

In July 2018, then British Secretary of State for Defense Gavin Williamson unveiled the UK's Combat Air Strategy and announced the development of a sixth-generation fighter concept named the Tempest for the Royal Air Force at Farnborough Airshow 2018.

In 2019, Sweden and Italy joined the Tempest project. During the same year, India and Japan were also invited to join the project. On 1 April 2020, the Japanese F-X program was announced. In 2022, after a year of ever closer collaboration with the Tempest project and a retreat from an industrial partnership with Lockheed Martin, Japan merged its F-X project with the BAE Tempest fighter development to form the three nation Global Combat Air Programme while opting to pursue separate drone development. Two weeks after the agreement was signed between the UK, Italy & Japan; Sweden signed a bi-lateral defence trade agreement with Japan allowing them to continue on as an observer in the programme  and the option to participate as a development partner in the future if desired.

France, Germany, Spain

France, Germany and Spain are also jointly working on a sixth-generation system. A test flight of a demonstrator is expected around 2027 and entry into service around 2040.   Also called SCAF to avoid confusion with FCAS Tempest.

Russia

On 26 August 2013, Russia revealed it would proceed with development of a sixth-generation jet fighter. They say the aircraft will most likely be pilotless. However, they would not skip completing development of fifth-generation fighter projects, like the Sukhoi Su-57.

Mikoyan PAK DP is a Russian program to develop a next generation interceptor aircraft to replace Mikoyan MiG-31. According to the Russian defense analyst Vasily Kashin, the aircraft would be considered as a 5++ or 6th generation fighter project. In January 2021, Rostec Corporation, the owner of Mikoyan, announced that the PAK DP had now entered the development phase, saying "Development of the next generation of interceptor fighters has already begun."

United States

The United States Air Force (USAF) and United States Navy (USN) are anticipated to field their first sixth-generation fighters in the 2030 timeframe. The USAF is pursuing development and acquisition of a sixth-generation air superiority fighter through the Next Generation Air Dominance (NGAD) program that succeeds the Lockheed Martin F-22 Raptor. The USN is pursuing a similar program using the same name with the fighter component called the F/A-XX, likewise intended to complement the smaller Lockheed Martin F-35C Lightning II and replace its existing aircraft such as the Boeing F/A-18E/F Super Hornet.

The U.S. Navy launched its sixth-generation F/A-XX program in 2008 and the USAF sought initial responses for a Next Generation Tactical Aircraft (Next Gen TACAIR), which would become the F-X program, in 2010.

In April 2013, DARPA initiated a study to try to bring together existing USAF and USN concepts.
Next-generation fighter efforts would initially be led by DARPA under the "Air Dominance Initiative" to develop prototype X-planes. The U.S. Navy and Air Force would each have variants focused on their mission requirements. However, also in 2013, the RAND Corporation recommended that the U.S. military services avoid joint programs for the development of the design of a sixth-generation fighter. They found that in previous joint programs, different service-specific requirements for complex programs had led to design compromises which raised costs far more than normal single-service programs.

In 2014, a broader approach to offensive technologies was proposed, with USAF aircraft anticipated to operate alongside ground-based and non-kinetic anti-aircraft solutions, and with a greater weapon load than current fighters. In 2016, the USAF consolidated this change of course for its Air Superiority 2030 plan, to pursue "a network of integrated systems disaggregated across multiple platforms" rather than focusing on the sixth-generation fighter. The Air Force and Navy requirements had already been merged the year before and were now formally integrated, with the joint focus to be on AI systems and a common airframe.

Boeing, Lockheed Martin and Northrop Grumman have all announced sixth-generation aircraft development projects. On September 14, 2020, the USAF announced that a prototype aircraft component of the Next-Generation Air Dominance (NGAD) program had flown for the first time. The details remained classified.

Concepts and technologies
There are significant differences between Navy and Air Force visions for their respective next-generation jet concepts, but both agree on some fundamental characteristics. These include artificial intelligence as a decision aid to the pilot, similar in concept to current sensor fusion.  They will also have Positioning, Navigation, and Timing (PNT), and communications that allow big data movement between both services' aircraft.

The USAF regard stealth as extremely important for the F-X, while the US Navy emphasize the F/A-XX should not be so focused on survivability as to sacrifice speed and payload.  Unlike the previous F-22 and F-35 development programs that depended on new technologies that drove up cost and delayed introduction, the Air Force is intending to follow a methodical path of risk reduction to include as much prototyping, technology demonstration, and systems engineering work as possible before creation of an aircraft actually starts. Sixth-generation strike capability is envisioned as a move beyond the limitations inherent to the potential abilities of a single strike aircraft. 6-Gen combat awareness will require a theatre-wide integration of diverse systems beginning with the primary airborne sensory suite and further including real-time data linking of ground-based detection and ranging technology with sensors aboard primary and support aircraft, advanced communication capabilities, unparalleled capacity for continuous onboard info-stream processing utilizing AI for real-time data translation and rendering geared toward optimizing pilot situational awareness while reducing workload, potential near-space capabilities, extension of existing strike/standoff ranges, seamless co-operation with ground-to air defense assets and the ability to deploy aircraft in manned, optionally manned, unmanned and stand-in options.

In March 2015, the Navy revealed they were working with the Air Force to potentially release joint analysis of alternatives (AoA) in 2016 for their next-generation fighters; they are allowed to take a joint AoA, then define a service solution that would be good for each service.  The Navy is focusing on replacing the capabilities of the fighter with a wide range of options for the Super Hornet, as well as the EA-18G Growler.  The AoA will run parallel to several other design and technology efforts including engine technology, airframe molds, broadband and IR stealth, and new ways to dominate the electromagnetic spectrum.  Part of the Navy's calculus will be based on how the F-35C performs as a critical forward sensor node for the carrier air wing.  How the fifth-generation F-35C integrates with the rest of the air wing to give greater capabilities than what the platform itself can do may lend itself to the sixth-generation F/A-XX. The Navy aircraft is to have greatly increased speed and range compared to the Super Hornet.

In April 2015, the Center for Strategic and Budgetary Assessments (CSBA) released a report concluding that the next-generation U.S. Air Force fighter should be larger and more resembling a bomber than a small, maneuverable traditional fighter.  It analyzed over 1,450 air-to-air engagements since 1965 and found that long-range weapons and sensors have dramatically decreased instances of dogfighting.  With the increase of air defense systems using electronic and infrared sensors and high-speed weapons, traditional designs relying on small size, high speed, and maneuverability may be less relevant and easier to intercept.  As a result, the CSBA suggests building a fighter significantly larger relying on enhanced sensors, signature control, networked situational awareness, and very-long-range weapons to complete engagements before being detected or tracked.  Larger planes would have greater range that would enable them to be stationed further from a combat zone, have greater radar and IR detection capabilities, and carry bigger and longer-range missiles (Long-Range Engagement Weapon).  One airframe could be fitted with various attachments to fill several roles.  The concept of a small number of large, intercontinental and heavily armed combat aircraft could link itself to the development of the Long Range Strike Bomber.

In November 2016, the USAF Scientific Advisory Board announced studies for a Penetrating Counter Air (PCA) platform that would combine long range, supersonic speed, stealth and maneuverability and be fielded by 2030. PCA would have substantially longer range to fly long distances over the Pacific, especially in a situation where airbases in the vicinity of China are not available or if aerial tankers are destroyed. It would also escort bombers deep into Russia or China, where the anticipated threat includes advanced networked air defense radars. It would include stealth against low or very high frequency radars (like those of the S-400 missile system), which requires an airframe with no vertical stabilizers. Another requirement is significantly larger payload than current air superiority aircraft like the F-22. Adaptive cycle engine technology is an option under consideration for the PCA, given the fact that the alternative would be a very large aircraft.

While current engines operate best at a single point in the flight envelope, sixth-generation engines are expected to have a variable cycle to give optimum efficiency at any speed or altitude, giving greater range, faster acceleration, and greater subsonic cruise efficiency. The engine would configure itself to act like a turbojet at supersonic speeds, while performing like a high-bypass turbofan for efficient cruising at slower speeds; the ability to supercruise will likely be available to aircraft with this engine type. The technology is being developed by the Air Force under the Adaptive Engine Transition Program (AETP) and by the Navy under its Variable Cycle Advanced Technology (VCAT) program. The Air Force is aiming for a Milestone A decision by 2018, with a production version to be ready possibly by 2021.  Companies involved with next-generation engine development include General Electric and Pratt & Whitney. Risk reduction began in 2012 so that engine development can start around 2020.  An engine is to be ready when fighters are introduced by the Navy in 2028 and the Air Force in 2032.

The Air Force is interested in lasers both for low-power illumination and as higher-powered weapons. In November 2013, the Air Force Research Laboratory released a request for information (RFI) for submissions with detailed descriptions in a militarily useful configuration, potential problems and solutions, and cost estimates.

China
After successfully developing its 5th generation fighter J-20, China is now working on the development of a next generation aircraft. Dr. Wang Haifeng, chief designer of the Chengdu Aerospace Corporation announced that China had begun pre-research on sixth-generation aircraft in January 2019, predicting that the program would come to fruition by 2035.

In February 2023, Aviation Industry Corporation of China (AVIC) shared its six-generation fighter aircraft concept on social media. The featured concept included diamond-shaped wings and tailless design, which correlated to earlier image released by various AVIC presentation. In 2018, Chengdu Aerospace Corp reportedly submitted eight proposals for the sixth-generation fighter design, and four designs were tested in low altitude wind tunnels.

India
In an interview on 8 October 2020 to celebrate the 88th anniversary of the Indian Air Force (IAF), Air Chief Marshal Rakesh Bhadauria was asked about plans for sixth-generation technologies and he responded that they have a clear roadmap for sixth-generation combat systems like directed energy weapons, smart wingman concept, optionally manned combat platforms, swarm drones, hypersonic weapons, and other equipment.

India is currently working on its fifth-generation AMCA which will have some sixth-generation technologies. IAF's new chief, Air Chief Marshal Vivek Ram Chaudhari reaffirms this in an interview given on 22 October 2021.

However, some analysts have questioned the feasibility of India's ability to develop a sixth generation, let alone a fifth generation fighter aircraft especially as India lacks the industrial base and technical capabilities to do so.

Comparison

 // - Global Combat Air Programme
 // - Dassault/Airbus FCAS
  - Mikoyan PAK DP
  - Next Generation Air Dominance for United States Air Force
  - F/A-XX for United States Navy (under development by Boeing)

See also
Fifth-generation jet fighter
Jet fighter generations

References

Notes

Bibliography
David Baker; Fifth Generation Fighters, Mortons, 2018. Chapter18, "Enter the Sixth".

External links
 The Race for 6th Generation Fighters - Drones, Lasers & Future Air Dominance Perun, Youtube

6th generation
21st century in technology